Neubot (the network neutrality bot) is a free software Internet bot, developed and maintained by the Nexa Center for Internet and Society, that gathers network performance data useful to investigate network neutrality.

Description 
Once installed on the user's computer, it runs in the background and periodically performs active transmission tests with servers hosted by the distributed Measurement Lab server platform (and, in future, with other instances of the software itself). These transmission tests measure end-to-end network performance emulating different protocols (currently HTTP and BitTorrent) as well as transmitting and receiving "raw" data over TCP. Performance are measured at application level as well as at TCP level (using Web100).
Measurements results are saved both locally (where a localhost-only web user interface allows users to browse them
) and on Measurement Lab servers. They are collected for research purposes
and automatically published on the web
under Creative Commons Zero (public domain) allowing anyone to re-use them freely for the same purpose.

See also

Network Neutrality

References

External links
 Neubot home page
 Neubot github repository
 Basso, S., Servetti, A., & De Martin, J. C. (2011, June). The network neutrality bot architecture: a preliminary approach for self-monitoring of Internet access QoS. In Computers and Communications (ISCC), 2011 IEEE Symposium on (pp. 1131-1136). IEEE. https://web.archive.org/web/20160304031834/http://www.neubot.org/neubotfiles/2011-iscc-paper.pdf
 De Martin, J. C., & Glorioso, A. (2008, June). The Neubot project: A collaborative approach to measuring internet neutrality. In Technology and Society, 2008. ISTAS 2008. IEEE International Symposium on (pp. 1-4). IEEE. https://web.archive.org/web/20160304002403/http://www.neubot.org/neubotfiles/istas08-neubot-paper.pdf
 "Neubot e Nexa Per Un Web Piu` Democratico" (in Italian)
 "Ma la rete e' ancora neutrale? Possiamo misurarlo con Neubot" (in Italian)
 "Servizi ADSL sotto esame" (in Italian)

Free software programmed in Python
Public domain databases